An early representation of the Spanish manual alphabet, engraved by Francisco de Paula Martí Mora (1761–1827) and published in 1815. Of an edition of 300, the only surviving copy is in the Biblioteca de Catalunya in Barcelona.

References 

Manual alphabet
1815 introductions
Spanish language
Languages attested from the 19th century